Josef Horčic (born 25 May 1945) is a Czech middle-distance runner. He competed in the men's 1500 metres at the 1972 Summer Olympics.

References

1945 births
Living people
Athletes (track and field) at the 1972 Summer Olympics
Czech male middle-distance runners
Czech male steeplechase runners
Olympic athletes of Czechoslovakia
Sportspeople from České Budějovice